Theta Crateris (θ Crateris) is a solitary star in the southern constellation of Crater. It is a photometric-standard star that is faintly visible to the naked eye with an apparent visual magnitude of 4.70. With an annual parallax shift of 11.63 mas as seen from Earth, it is located around 280 light years from the Sun. At that distance, the visual magnitude of the star is diminished by an extinction factor of 0.07 because of interstellar dust.

This is a B-type main sequence star with a stellar classification of B9.5 Vn, where the 'n' suffix indicates "nebulous" absorption lines due to rapid rotation. It is spinning with a projected rotational velocity of 212 km/s, giving the star an oblate shape with an equatorial bulge that is an estimated 7% larger than the polar radius. The star has 2.79 times the mass of the Sun and around 3.1 times the Sun's radius. With an age of about 117 million years, it is radiating 107 times the solar luminosity from its outer atmosphere at an effective temperature of 11,524 K.

References

External links

B-type main-sequence stars
Crater (constellation)
Crateris, Theta
Crateris, 21
100889
056633
4468
Durchmusterung objects